Grandview Gardens may refer to:

Daguanyuan or Grand View Garden, a fictitious garden in the Chinese classic novel Dream of the Red Chamber
Grandview Gardens, West Virginia, an unincorporated community in West Virginia
Grandview Gardens, Ontario, one of the neighbourhoods of Sault Ste. Marie, Ontario